Amphipteryx is a genus of damselflies, the only genus in the family Amphipterygidae. It is limited to Mesoamerica from Mexico to Honduras and Guatemala.

Most damselflies in this family live in tropical rainforests and cloud forests. They rest on vegetation hanging over seeps and streams. The larvae live in gravel and leaf litter.

There are five species in this family:

Amphipteryx agrioides Selys, 1853 – Montane Relict Damsel
Amphipteryx chiapensis González, 2010
Amphipteryx jaroli Jocque & Argueta, 2014
Amphipteryx longicaudata González, 1991
Amphipteryx meridionalis González, 2010
Amphipteryx nataliae González, 2010

References

Calopterygoidea
Zygoptera genera
Taxa named by Edmond de Sélys Longchamps
Taxonomy articles created by Polbot